Kangarban-e Sofla (also Romanized as Kangarbān-e Soflá; also known as Kangarbān-e Pā’īn and Paiāwand) is a village in Chaqa Narges Rural District, Mahidasht District, Kermanshah County, Kermanshah Province, Iran. At the 2006 census, its population was 240, in 51 families.

References 

Populated places in Kermanshah County